The Concordia Travelers were an American minor league baseball team. The club was founded in 1910 in the Central Kansas League and was managed by player-manager Harry Short. The Travelers also featured notable players Chick Smith, Harry Chapman, and John Misse.

The team won their league championships in 1910 and 1911.

References 

Defunct baseball teams in Kansas
Travelers
1910 establishments in Kansas
1911 disestablishments in Kansas
Baseball teams disestablished in 1911
Baseball teams established in 1910